Uruguay competed at the 1948 Summer Olympics in London, England. 61 competitors, 60 men and 1 woman, took part in 32 events in 11 sports.

Medalists

Silver
 Eduardo Risso — Rowing, Men's Single Sculls

Bronze
 William Jones and Juan Rodriquez — Rowing, Men's Double Sculls

Athletics

Hércules Azcune
Mario Fayos
Juan López Testa
Walter Pérez Soto
Pedro Listur

Basketball

Martín Acosta y Lara
Victorio Cieslinskas
Nelson Demarco
Miguel Diab
Abraham Eidlin Grossman
Eduardo Folle
Héctor García
Eduardo Gordon
Adesio Lombardo
Roberto Lovera
Gustavo Morales
Carlos Rosello
Héctor Ruiz
Nelson Antón Giudice

Boxing

Alberto Boullosa
Basilio Álvez
Pedro Carrizo
Feliciano Rossano
Guillermo Porteiro
Felipe Posse
Dogomar Martínez
Agustín Muñiz

Cycling

Nine male cyclists represented Uruguay in 1948.

Individual road race
 Waldemar Bernatzky
 Enrique Demarco
 Mario Figueredo
 Luis López

Team road race
 Waldemar Bernatzky
 Enrique Demarco
 Mario Figueredo
 Luis López

Sprint
 Leonel Rocca

Time trial
 Carlos Tramutolo

Team pursuit
 Atilio François
 Juan de Armas
 Luis Ángel de los Santos
 Waldemar Bernatzky

Fencing

Five fencers, all men, represented the Uruguay in 1948.

Men's foil
 Sergio Iesi
 Daniel Rossi
 Jaime Ucar

Men's team foil
 Daniel Rossi, Jaime Ucar, Sergio Iesi, Juan Paladino, César Gallardo

Men's sabre
 Juan Paladino

Modern pentathlon

Three male pentathletes represented the Uruguay in 1948.

 Alberto Ortíz
 Carlos Mercader
 Ruben Orozco

Rowing

Uruguay had three male rowers participate in two out of seven rowing events in 1948.

 Men's single sculls
 Eduardo Risso

 Men's double sculls
 William Jones
 Juan Rodríguez

Sailing

Swimming

Florbel Pérez
Carlos Noriega

Water polo

 Ramón Abella

Art competitions

References

External links
Montevideo.com
Official Olympic Reports
International Olympic Committee results database

Nations at the 1948 Summer Olympics
1948
1948 in Uruguayan sport